The Chevrolet Omega is an executive car sold by Chevrolet for the Brazilian market.  Replacing the Chevrolet Opala, which was a development of the Opel Rekord C, the original Chevrolet Omega was based on the Opel Omega A and built locally between 1992 and 1998.  After 1999, local production ceased, and General Motors do Brasil imported badge engineered versions of the Holden Commodore from Australia.


Omega A 

Based on the Opel Omega A, the Chevrolet Omega A debuted in Brazil in 1992 with a choice of two engines—a 2.0-liter four-cylinder (GLS and GL trim) and 3.0-liter six-cylinder (CD trim). From 1995, following the discontinuation of Omega A in Germany, the engines were upgraded to a 2.2-liter four (GLS) and a  Chevrolet straight-six engine (CD) as used in the previous GM Opala albeit tuned by Lotus and with electronic multiport fuel injection added. Both sedan and station wagon (called Omega Suprema) body styles were available. The station wagon shared the exact powertrain configuration and trim options with the sedan versions. Some funeral parlor owners chose the Omega Suprema as their preferred car for hearse-based modifications.

In addition to the bigger engines, suited to local gasoline quality, General Motors do Brasil had also deemed it necessary to beef up the suspension of the Omega to deal with Brazilian road conditions. The CD version was offered the availability of the 4L30-E automatic transmission as an option.

Omega B 

In October 1998, with the Chevrolet Omega B, General Motors do Brasil ceased local production in favor of a rebadged version of the Holden Calais (VT) sedan imported from Australia (as would be the case for Middle East bound models, instead badged Chevrolet Lumina).

The Brazilian model sold in a single "CD" specification, based on the Holden Calais powered by the Ecotec 3.8-liter V6 engine developing . The VT II model came to Brazil in December 1999.

On 18 May 2001, GM announced that the Omega CD would now be based on the VX Calais, designed and manufactured in Australia. Although based on the Holden Calais, the Brazilian model instead featured the trunk lid from VX series base models (whose tail lamps did not extend into the trunk lid).

The next update was announced by GM on 28 April 2003, with the Omega CD now based on the VY Calais, again in a single "CD" specification.

GM announced a final update of Omega B on 9 March 2005, now based on the Holden VZ series, powered by the new 3.6-liter Alloytec V6 engine. It was again sold in a single "CD" specification-specification CD model, this time based on the VZ Berlina with some extra equipment from the VZ Calais. Sales ended in 2007 with the arrival of the new Omega C.

Omega C 

For the third generation Chevrolet Omega C, General Motors again looked to Holden. The new model was announced on 4 July 2007, was now based on a rebadged Holden Berlina (VE). It was again powered by the 3.6-liter Alloytec V6 engine. Due to the global financial crisis, imports ceased in 2008.

Facelift 
The Omega was re-released in September 2010. The first 600 models were sold as the "Omega Fittipaldi Edition", named after the homonymous 1970s Brazilian Formula One World Champion. The new Omega's specifications now reflected those of the Australian Holden Calais (VE Series II), except for specially tuned suspension settings for Brazil's road conditions. Imports ceased after 2011 with no further Holden-based products being sold in Brazil since.

References 

Omega
Rear-wheel-drive vehicles
Executive cars
1990s cars
2000s cars
2010s cars